Calamis (fl. 4th century BC) was a Greek sculptor.  One of his pupils was Praxias.

References

Hellenistic sculptors
4th-century BC Greek sculptors
Ancient Greek sculptors